Shu (Egyptian šw, "emptiness" or "he who rises up") was one of the primordial Egyptian gods, spouse and brother to the goddess Tefnut, and one of the nine deities of the Ennead of the Heliopolis cosmogony. He was the god of peace, lions, air, and wind.

Family

In Heliopolitan theology, Atum created the first couple of the Ennead, Shu and Tefnut by masturbating or by spitting. Shu was the father of Nut and Geb and grandfather of Osiris, Isis, Set, and Nephthys. His great-grandsons are Horus and Anubis.

Myths

As the air, Shu was considered to be a cooling, and thus calming, influence, and pacifier. Due to the association with dry air, calm, and thus Ma'at (truth, justice, order, and balance), Shu was depicted as the  dry air/atmosphere between the earth and sky, separating the two realms after the event of the First Occasion. Shu was also portrayed in art as wearing an ostrich feather. Shu was seen with between one and four feathers. The ostrich feather was symbolic of lightness and emptiness. Fog and clouds were also Shu's elements and they were often called his bones. Because of his position between the sky and earth, he was also known as the wind.

In a much later myth, representing a terrible weather disaster at the end of the Old Kingdom, it was said that Tefnut and Shu once argued, and Tefnut left Egypt for Nubia (which was always more temperate). It was said that Shu quickly decided that he missed her, but she changed into a cat that destroyed any man or god that approached. Thoth, disguised, eventually succeeded in convincing her to return.

The Greeks associated Shu with Atlas, the primordial Titan who held up the celestial spheres, as they are both depicted holding up the sky.

According to the Heliopolitan cosmology, Shu and Tefnut, the first pair of cosmic elements, created the sky goddess, Nut, and the earth god, Geb. Shu separated Nut from Geb as they were in the act of love, creating duality in the manifest world: above and below, light and dark, good and evil.  Prior to their separation, however, Nut had given birth to the gods Isis, Osiris, Nephthys (Horus) and Set. The Egyptians believed that if Shu did not hold Nut (sky) and Geb (earth) apart there would be no way for physically-manifest life to exist.

Shu is mostly represented as a man. Only in his function as a fighter and defender as the sun god and he sometimes receive a lion's head. He carries an ankh, the symbol of life.

See also
 Anhur-Shu

References

Further reading
 Hans Bonnet: Lexikon der ägyptischen Religionsgeschichte, Berlin 2000, S. 685-689 → Shu
 Adolf Erman: Die Aegyptische Religion, Verlag Georg Reimer, Berlin 1909
 Wolfgang Helck: Kleines Lexikon der Ägyptologie, 1999 , S. 269f. → Shu
 Francoise Dunand and Christiane Zivie-Coche: "Gods and Men in Egypt 3000 BCE to 395 CE", Cornell University Press 2005, 
 Jacobus Van Dijk, Myth and Mythmaking in Ancient Egypt, ed. J.M. Sasson, New York, Simon & Schuster, 1995.

Egyptian gods
Wind gods
Atlas (mythology)
Lion deities
Personifications